Cuauhtémoc Ochoa Fernández (born 1 December 1970) is a Mexican politician affiliated with Morena. He currently serves as a federal deputy in the LXV Legislature of the Mexican Congress.

Ochoa graduated with a degree in civil engineering from the Universidad Iberoamericana and also holds a certificate in Administration and Finances from the Instituto Tecnológico Autónomo de México (ITAM).

After several years in various construction industry companies, Ochoa joined the Ecologist Green Party of Mexico (PVEM) in 1999. He ran unsuccessfully for the Hidalgo state congress in 2001 but was more successful at obtaining a seat in the LIX Legislature of the Mexican Congress in 2003. He was a secretary on five commissions, including several investigating oil prices, contract awards, and environmental damage caused by Pemex.

From 2007 to 2009, he was the state tourism secretary of Hidalgo; he then spent the next two years as the Secretary of Public Works, Communications, Transportation and Settlements. In 2012, he was tapped by incoming president Enrique Peña Nieto for a deputy secretary position in the Secretariat of Environment and Natural Resources.

Ochoa returned to the Chamber of Deputies in 2021, winning election as a Morena candidate in the fifth district of Hidalgo (including Tula de Allende).

References

1970 births
Living people
Politicians from Mexico City
Members of the Chamber of Deputies (Mexico) for Hidalgo (state)
Ecologist Green Party of Mexico politicians
21st-century Mexican politicians
Universidad Iberoamericana alumni
Morena (political party) politicians
Deputies of the LIX Legislature of Mexico
Deputies of the LXV Legislature of Mexico